Stockholm City Station is a railway station in central Stockholm, Sweden. Opened on 10 July 2017, the station is located on the Stockholm City Line and is located directly below T-Centralen (the hub of the Stockholm Metro) and interchange with Stockholm Central Station. The station serves all Stockholm Commuter Rail trains. It is the busiest railway station in Sweden (not counting the metro).

Facilities

The station is located directly below T-Centralen, and allows quicker transfer between metro and commuter rail than the past solution, with the commuter trains stopping at the central station. The station has two entrances, which are shared with the metro station. One exit at Vasaplan is with access to the Arlanda Express, and the other at Centralplan beside Scandic Continental. At ground level, the station has a glass facade to allow as much sunlight as possible to penetrate down to the track level. It includes accesses to the metro's Green Line platforms towards Hagsätra, Skarpnäck and Farsta, and the Red Line's platforms towards Mörby and Ropsten.

History
Construction started in 2009 and was done by building access tunnels from the depot at the central station, Vattugaraget and Torsgatan. The tunneling and bedrock work was completed in 2013, after which the station itself with facilities was built.

Gallery

Access to the Station

Concourse

Platforms

Construction

References

External links
Plan of station (pdf)

Stockholm City Line
Railway stations located underground in Stockholm
Railway stations opened in 2017
2017 establishments in Sweden